Kutcher may refer to:

People
Ashton Kutcher (born 1978), American actor
Demi Kutcher (born 1962), known as Demi Moore, American actress
Justin Kutcher, American sportscaster
Lorraine Kutcher (born 1938), Australian cricket player
Randy Kutcher (born 1960), American baseball player
Samuel Kutcher (1898-1984), Kutcher String Quartet violinist 
Stan Kutcher, Canadian senator and psychiatrist 
Steven R. Kutcher (born 1944), American entomologist

Other
Kutcher Adolescent Depression Scale, psychological self-rating scale
Mashd N Kutcher, Australian dance act and electronic band
Kutcher String Quartet